Eau Claire is a planned and approved CTrain light rail station in Calgary, Alberta, Canada part of the Green Line. Construction is expected to begin in 2022 and complete in 2027 as the northern terminus of construction phase one. The station is named for and located in the high density urban community of Eau Claire, immediately north of downtown Calgary. 

The station will be underground, integrated into the future Eau Claire Market redevelopment site. Similar to Calgary's Central Library, the redeveloped market will have a tunnel portal on the north end of the building where the line will exit the station and enter an S-curved elevated guideway over Prince's Island Park.

This station will provide access to Chinatown, as well the Bow River Pathway, Princes Island Park, the Peace Bridge, the Chinese Cultural Centre and numerous office, residential, and commercial towers.

References 

CTrain stations
Railway stations scheduled to open in 2027